Sideling Hill Creek is a  tributary of Aughwick Creek in Huntingdon County, Pennsylvania in the United States. Via Aughwick Creek and the Juniata River, it is part of the Susquehanna River watershed.

Sideling Hill Creek joins Aughwick Creek near the community of Maddensville.

Bridges
The Frehn Bridge crosses Sideling Hill Creek at Springfield Township.

See also
List of rivers of Pennsylvania

References

Rivers of Pennsylvania
Tributaries of the Juniata River
Rivers of Huntingdon County, Pennsylvania